Busoga United Football Club, also Busoga United FC, is a football team from the town of Jinja, Jinja District, in the Busoga sub-region, in the Eastern Region of Uganda, who currently play in the Uganda Premier League after their promotion, in the 2013/2014 season.

History 
Before Coach Abbey Kikomeko Bogere was re-appointed as the Club head coach in January 2019, Coach Ayiekho Lukula and Mugerwa were the Technical Staff members who ran JSSS FC, which was created in 2012 and is currently managed by Coach Abbey. The Club's CEO was chosen by Hassan Takoowa. Coach Abbey and Hassan Takoowa had a successful working relationship, which helped the Club place fourth in the 2019–20 season. As of right now, Hassan Takoowa has taken over as the club's chairman in lieu of Diana Hope Nyago. Takoowa guided the team through its narrow escape from relegation in the 2020–21 season thanks to shrewd management and a talented technical staff led by Coach Abbey Kikomeko Bogere.

Crest

Records and Statistics

Players 
Current Squad as of October 18th 2022.

Current squad

Management

Corporate hierarchy.

Technical Team hierarchy 
Position	    Name
Chairman:  Hassan Takoowa
Head Coach/ Manager:  Kikomeko Abbey Bogere
Assistant Head Coach:  Jalendo Jimmy
Goal Keeping Coach:  Bright Dhaira
Fitness Coach :  Ikoba Afani
Team Doctor:  Kulika Ivan
Team Doctor:  Nayenga Uthiman
Physiotherapist:  Kyeyune Aloysius

Stadium 
The team uses Kakindu Stadium that has a seating capacity of 1,000 and this is shared with different clubs with in the Busoga Region like Bul FC, Jinja Municipal Council Football Club.

References

External links
 Website of Kirinya-Jinja SSS FC

Football clubs in Uganda
2012 establishments in Uganda
Association football clubs established in 2012